Mandala Tayde (born 27 April 1975) is a German actress and model who works in Italy and Germany.

Career
Tayde was born and raised in Frankfurt by German-Indian parents. She started a modeling career at 13, with a campaign for beauty products. After intensive drama education at the Central School of Speech and Drama in London, she moved to Italy in 1997, where she played in the movie Fireworks which earned 36 million euros. She also acted in the praised Indian film, Dil Chahta Hai.

Tayde became famous in Germany for her lead role of Aylin in the TV film , where she acted with Florian David Fitz. This role earned her an Adolf Grimme Award in 2007. At the end of the 1990s she returned to German television in the lead role of the Arabian princess Amina in the TV story in three parts Desert of Fire, a French-Italian-German coproduction. In addition, she played alongside Kabir Bedi in The Return of Sandokan.

Selected filmography 
 1996: The Return of Sandokan
 1997: Desert of Fire
 1997: Fireworks
 1998: Tristan und Isolde - Eine Liebe für die Ewigkeit (TV Part 1/2)
 2000: Tödliche Wildnis – Sie waren jung und mussten sterben (TV film)
 2000: Liebe pur (TV film)
 2001: Santa Maradona
 2001: Dil Chahta Hai
 2001: Days of Grace
 2006:  (TV film)
 2006: Vater auf der Flucht (TV film)
 2006: Hate 2 O
 2008: Tatort – Familienaufstellung
 2008: Inspector Montalbano La Pista di Sabbia, horse owner Rachele Esterman
 2009: Wilsberg – Oh du tödliche…
 Guest-starring in a few television series, such as Leipzig Homicide

Other appearances (magazines/interviews) 
 1998: PlayBoy German Dezember 1998 edition (magazine)

Personal life
She has a son named Leon.

References

External links
 
 Official web site

1975 births
German female models
German film actresses
Living people
Alumni of the Royal Central School of Speech and Drama
German people of Indian descent
German expatriates in Italy
Actors from Frankfurt
German television actresses
20th-century German actresses
21st-century German actresses